Paddington is a British children's animated television series based on the Paddington Bear books by Michael Bond. Broadcast from 1976 to 1980, the series was scripted by Bond himself, and produced by FilmFair; it was narrated by Michael Hordern, who also voiced all of the characters.

Paddington is animated in stop motion. Paddington himself is a puppet in a three-dimensional environment, whilst other characters are paper cut-outs. The final television special used a slightly different technique using 2D drawn fully animated characters.

BBC1 premiered Paddington in January 1976; the series concluded in May, but was appended by two Christmas specials in December. A second series—retitled The Adventures of Paddington—followed in October 1979, and ran until April 1980. In all, 56 episodes were broadcast, followed by three television specials: Paddington Goes to the Movies (1983), Paddington Goes to School (1984), and Paddington’s Birthday Bonanza (1987).

Paddington was the first television programme adapted from the Paddington Bear stories. Paddington Bear (1989) was produced by Hanna-Barbera for broadcast syndication, while The Adventures of Paddington Bear (1997) was produced by CINAR and Protecrea.

Source material
Episodes of Paddington are based on stories published in the following books by Michael Bond:

Characters

Paddington Bear - the protagonist, an accident-prone but well-meaning bear from Darkest Peru. He was named Paddington Brown by the Browns after they found him at Paddington Station as his Peruvian name was difficult to pronounce. He has a fondness for marmalade sandwiches and always keeps one under his hat for emergencies. He is initially found to be wearing a luggage label around his neck bearing the words "Please look after this bear. Thank you." He is also very polite, never addressing someone by their first name but always by their title (Mr., Mrs., Master or Miss).
Mr. Henry Brown - the patriarch of the Brown family.
Mrs. Mary Brown - the matriarch of the Brown family.
Jonathan and Judy Brown - the Brown family children. It is never established if one is older than the other, leading to the perception they are twins.
Mrs. Bird - the Browns' stern but ultimately friendly nanny and housekeeper.
Mr. Gruber - the owner of the antique shop on Portobello Road which Paddington frequents for elevenses. He is an elderly man who hails from Hungary.
Mr. Curry - the Browns' mean, moody and bad-tempered next-door neighbour. He often seeks to get something for nothing and frequently addresses Paddington as "Bear!".

Broadcast

In 1975, FilmFair completed production of the first series, which comprised 30 episodes. The first series aired on BBC1 in 1976. The second series, which comprised 26 episodes, was titled The Adventures of Paddington. These aired in 1978 and 1979, followed by specials in 1980, 1984, and 1986. It later aired on Channel 4 with the series being shown on a wrapper programme called Take 5 which airs several other children's programmes that been previously shown on other television stations and then on ITV in 1997 as part of their children's block CITV and aired until 2000, And also, the episodes of Paddington aired on Milkshake! on Channel 5.

In the United States, episodes of Paddington aired on PBS; on the syndicated series Romper Room; on Nickelodeon as a segment on the programme Pinwheel; on USA Network as a segment on Calliope; between preschool programs on The Disney Channel; on HBO in between features and (from the late 1980s to the 1990s) as a segment on the programme Lunch Box. also in 1990, Paddington aired on ABC and later Freeform.

In the Republic of Ireland, the series was broadcast on Raidió Telefís Éireann.

The series later aired in Singapore on Channel 5 as part of their children's block Kids Corner.

The series was also broadcast on e.tv in South Africa during the late 2000s and early 2010s.

In Brunei, the series aired on RTB.

In Japan, it was broadcast on NHK E from 1994 to 1997.

In Hong Kong, the series was transmitted on Rediffusion Television (which later became ATV in 1982) and aired as part of a children's block called The 5 O'Clock Club.

In Germany the series aired on ZDF, Super RTL in Toggolino, RTL II in Vampy, Sat.1, Tele 5 in Bim Bam Bino, VOX, Das Erste, Kinderkanal, BR, Hr, Rbb, MDR, NDR, WDR, SWR, SR, BR-alpha, One, 3sat, Eins Plus and EinsMuXx

In Italy, the series aired on Rai Uno in 1977.

In Australia, the Australian Broadcasting Corporation broadcast the programme in the early 1980s.

In New Zealand, it was shown on TVNZ 1 (originally TV One) in the late 1970s and during the 1980s.

Theme music 
The composition that became known as the Paddington Bear theme was composed by Herbert Chappell and began life as incidental music for the 1972 BBC adaptation of Lord Peter Wimsey. Its first commercial release was on the b-side of the Lord Peter Wimsey theme single in 1972, where it was titled "Size Ten Shuffle" and credited to "Boyfriends".  This recording - which is not the one actually featured in Paddington - has since appeared on several TV theme compilation albums.

The composition first became connected with Paddington in a theatre show, "The Adventures of a Bear Called Paddington", in 1973. The track now had lyrics (provided by Herbert Chappell's wife Brenda Johnson) and was retitled simply "Paddington Bear". A version performed by Bernard Cribbins appeared on a four-track single of songs from the show in 1974.

The piece was re-recorded (in two different versions) for the TV show; no performers are credited onscreen apart from composer Herbert Chappell. One of these takes was released on the 1976 album "Paddington's Party Record" which credits the performers as Freddie Williams and The Master Singers. This vinyl release remains the only source of the original televised version of the Paddington theme tune.

Episodes

Series 1: Paddington (1976)

Series 2: The Adventures of Paddington (1979–80)

Specials (1980–86)
Three television specials aired on BBC from 1980 to 1986.

In popular culture

Paddington is seen in four adverts for Marmite in the late 2000s.

In 2009, the version of Paddington from this show appeared in The Official BBC Children in Need Medley by Peter Kay's Animated All Star Band alongside other animated characters.

Home media

DVD
In Region 2, Abbey Home Media Group released the entire series on DVD-Video in the UK on 23 June 2008 (Cat. No. AHEDVD 3318).  The 2-disc set features all 56 short episodes as well as the 3 TV specials.

In Region 1, Mill Creek Entertainment (under licence from Cookie Jar Group) released the complete series on DVD on 15 February 2011 in a 3-disc set entitled Paddington Bear- The Complete Classic Series which includes 15 bonus episodes of The Wombles and Huxley Pig.

VHS

In 1980, Thorn EMI Entertainment released six VHS video cassettes in the UK, each with five episodes from the first series. They released two more cassettes in 1982, each with five episodes from the second series. In August 1983, they released a single video cassette featuring ten episodes from the second series. In December 1983, they released the TV special of Paddington Goes to the Movies on a single video cassette along with five episodes from the second series.

In 1985 and 1986, Walt Disney Home Video released five VHS volumes in the US.

In 1987, HBO Video released video cassettes.

In June 1987, Screen Legends released two single video cassettes containing five episodes from the first series on each one.

In Autumn 1987, Screen Legends released a "Double Bumper Issue" video cassette containing 10 episodes from the first series.

In 1988, Screen Legends released a single video cassette with 10 episodes.

In 1988, Screen Legends had released a 'Watch and Play'-type video with five stories from the first series.

In 1988, Kids Klassics released video cassettes.

In 1989, GTK, Inc. released six videocassettes as part of their Video Classics Library. The only known release is Paddington's Birthday Bonanza.

On 4 March 1991, Abbey Home Entertainment released two videos with 10 stories on each tape.

On 15 July 1991, Abbey Home Entertainment released a special edition video with 12 episodes.

On 9 September 1991, Abbey Home Entertainment released a Christmas-themed video with 10 episodes.

On 19 September 1994, BMG Video released a single video cassette with the three feature-length specials.

On 28 December 1994, Abbey Home Entertainment released a single video release with eight episodes from the second series.

On 3 April 1995, Abbey Home Entertainment released a 3-hour biggest ever video cassette with 37 episodes.

On 18 March 2002, Universal Pictures (UK) Ltd released a single video cassette with ten episodes from the first series.

On 22 July 2002, Universal Pictures (UK) Ltd released a seaside-themed bumper video with nine episodes from the second series.

On 21 April 2003, Universal Pictures (UK) Ltd released two videos with seven episodes on each one.

UK DVD releases

Between 2006 and 2007, three DVD releases of Paddington Bear were published by Abbey Home Media in the 'Tempo TV Classics' range of children's DVD releases.

On 8 October 2007, Abbey Home Media released two of the TV specials on a single DVD release.

On 27 October 2008, Abbey Home Media released a suitcase-shaped DVD box set with four single DVD releases.

On 21 May 2012, Abbey Home Media released four episodes from the first series and eight episodes from the second series which were compiled together as twelve London-themed episodes on a single DVD release.

On 18 April 2016, to coincide with the Queen's 90th birthday, Abbey Home Media released a special "Royal Celebration"-themed DVD release which contained the three TV specials altogether on one single disc.

See also

 The Wombles (1973)
 Old Bear Stories (1993)

References

External links
 
 
 Paddington at Toonhound

Paddington Bear
1976 British television series debuts
1986 British television series endings
1970s British children's television series
1980s British children's television series
British children's animated adventure television series
BBC children's television shows
British stop-motion animated television series
British television shows based on children's books
Television series by FilmFair
Television series by Cookie Jar Entertainment
English-language television shows
Television shows set in London
1970s British animated television series
1980s British animated television series
Animated television series about bears
Channel 4 original programming
ITV children's television shows
Australian Broadcasting Corporation original programming
NHK original programming
Fox Family Channel original programming